Perry Stokes Airport  is  northeast of Trinidad, Colorado. From 1949–50 to 1957 it was on Continental's route between Denver and Albuquerque, one DC-3 a day each way; it had commuter-airline flights in 1969–71, and possibly none since.

Facilities
 3/21: 5,500 x , asphalt
 9/27: 5,500 x , gravel/dirt

History
Built in 1936 by the Works Project Administration, it was originally named Trinidad Airport. It takes its current name from Perry F. Stokes, an early airport manager and flight instructor.

References

External links 

FAA Master Record for TAD

 Airports in Colorado
Transportation buildings and structures in Las Animas County, Colorado